Founded in 1963, the charter of the NSW Council for Civil Liberties is to protect the rights and liberties of Australian citizens (as long as they do not infringe the rights and freedoms of others) and to oppose abusive or excessive exercise of power by the state against its people.

The council has a committee elected by volunteers whose primary role is to influence public debate and government policy on a range of human rights issues, aiming to secure amendments to laws and policies which are perceived to unreasonably abridge civil liberties. Additionally, it may provide authoritative support and legal representation to citizens and groups facing civil liberties problems.
Typical issues have included advocacy of a bill of rights, the death penalty, prisoners issues, free speech, sniffer dogs, double jeopardy, freedom of information, the right to protest, ATSI (Aboriginal and Torres Strait Islanders) rights, asylum seekers, drug reform and privacy.

Organisation

Stephen Blanks, President from October 2013

Cameron Murphy, President from October 1998 - October 2013
Kevin O'Rourke
John Marsden

Funding

Positions

Mandatory sentencing

Sniffer dogs

Tasers

Death penalty

Free speech

CCTV

Government surveillance

Terrorism laws

LGBT rights

Privacy
President of NSW Council for Civil Liberties Stephen Blanks raised questions about the use of drones for police investigations of crime scenes. In June 2015 Blanks said,"There are obvious benefits for crime investigation as long as guidelines are in place which clearly say how the information is going to be used and how inappropriate access is going to be prevented."

Support and opposition

Early years

Founding in 1963

1960s & 1970s
 Ken Buckley

1980s & 1990s

Modern Era

1998 and Cameron Murphy

September 11, 2001

2000s

Paul Lynch MP, Shadow Attorney General acknowledges the contribution of the NSWCCL in Parliament in November 2013 on the occasion of its 50th Anniversary.

Terrorism and Civil Liberties

In a recent speech to the NSW Council for Civil Liberties, High Court Justice Michael Kirby delivered an important reminder to all civil libertarians:

"Let there be no doubt that real terrorists are the enemies of civil liberties...

"Nevertheless...we must also recognise...the need to draw a distinction between 'terrorists' and those who are simply objecting to injustice as they see it. In his day, Mahatma Gandhi was certainly called a terrorist. So was Nelson Mandela...

"[We must also recognise] that, in responding to violent antagonists, democratic communities must do so in a way, as far as possible, consistent with the defence of civil liberties."

References

External links
 New South Wales Council for Civil Liberties - Official website
 New South Wales Council for Civil Liberties: A Brief History

Organisations based in New South Wales